Dorothy Ko (born 1957) is a Professor of History and Women's Studies at the Barnard College of Columbia University. She is a historian of early modern China, known for her multi-disciplinary and multi-dimensional research. As a historian of early modern China, she has endeavored to engage with the field of modern China studies; as a China scholar, she has always positioned herself within the study of women and gender and applied feminist approaches in her work; as a historian, she has ventured across disciplinary boundaries, into fields that include literature, visual and material culture, science and technology, as well as studies of fashion, the body and sexuality.

Prior to joining the faculty of Barnard and Columbia, Ko has taught at the University of California, San Diego and at Rutgers University. Ko's research has been supported by the John Simon Guggenheim Memorial Foundation and the Institute for Advanced Study, Princeton, among others. She was named a fellow of the American Academy of Arts and Sciences in 2022.

Education
Ko received secondary education at the Queen Elizabeth School, Hong Kong. She pursued university and doctoral education at Stanford University, where she received the B.A., M.A., and PhD degrees.

Works
 Teachers of the Inner Chambers: Women and Culture in Seventeenth-Century China (Stanford University Press, 1994)
 Every Step a Lotus: Shoes for Bound Feet (University of California Press, 2001)
 Cinderella’s Sisters: A Revisionist History of Footbinding (University of California Press, 2005). This book is awarded the Joan Kelley Memorial prize from the American Historical Association for the best book on women's history or feminist theory published in the year.
Women and Confucian cultures in pre-modern China, Korea, and Japan (University of California Press, 2003), co-edited by Ko, JaHyun Kim Haboush, and Joan R. Piggott

References

External links
curriculum vitae of Barnard faculty
Dorothy Ko papers - Pembroke Center, Brown University
Faculty of Columbia History Department
Wetherhead East Asian Institute
University of Michigan news release
University of California Press announcement

Living people
21st-century American historians
Historians of the United States
Stanford University alumni
Columbia University faculty
Women's studies academics
American women historians
Feminist historians
20th-century American women writers
21st-century American women writers
20th-century American non-fiction writers
21st-century American non-fiction writers
Year of birth missing (living people)
Fellows of the American Academy of Arts and Sciences